Philippe is a masculine  sometimes feminine given name, cognate to Philip. It may refer to:

 Philippe of Belgium (born 1960), King of the Belgians (2013–present)
 Philippe (footballer) (born 2000), Brazilian footballer
 Prince Philippe, Count of Flanders, father to Albert I of Belgium
 Philippe d'Orléans (disambiguation), multiple people
 Philippe A. Autexier (1954–1998), French music historian
 Philippe Blain, French volleyball player and coach
 Philippe Najib Boulos (1902–1979), Lebanese lawyer and politician
 Philippe Coutinho, Brazilian footballer
 Philippe Daverio (1949–2020), Italian art historian
 Philippe Dubuisson-Lebon, Canadian football player
 Philippe Ginestet (born 1954), French billionaire businessman, founder of GiFi
 Philippe Gilbert, Belgian bicycle racer
 Philippe Petit, French performer and tightrope artist
 Philippe Petitcolin (born 1952/53), French businessman, CEO of Safran
 Philippe Russo, French singer
 Philippe Sella, French rugby player
 Philippe Senderos, Swiss footballer
 Philippe Swan, Belgian singer-songwriter

See also
 
 
 Philippe's or Philippe the Original, a restaurant in Los Angeles

French masculine given names